The Heart of Rock & Roll – The Best of Huey Lewis and The News is a compilation album by American rock band Huey Lewis and the News, released in 1992. It includes singles and album tracks from five of the band's studio albums―Huey Lewis and the News (1980), Picture This (1982), Sports (1983), Fore! (1986) and Small World (1988)―plus two tracks from the Back to the Future soundtrack (1985) and a live B-side.

Track listing

Charts

Certifications

References

1992 greatest hits albums
Huey Lewis and the News albums
Chrysalis Records compilation albums